XXL may refer to:
 XXL (club), in London, UK
 XXL (magazine), an American hip-hop magazine
 Penny Market XXL, a Romanian hypermarket chain
 XXL Sport & Villmark, a Norwegian sporting goods retailer

Film and television
 XXL (film), a 1997 French comedy
 XXL (French TV channel), an adult TV station

Music
 XXL (album), by Gordon Goodwin's Big Phat Band
 "XXL" (Keith Anderson song)
 "XXL" (Mylène Farmer song), a 1995 song recorded by French singer-songwriter Mylène Farmer
 XXL (Macedonian band), a girl group which took part in the Eurovision Song Contest 2000
 Xiu Xiu Larsen, a combined project of the bands Xiu Xiu and Larsen

See also
 Plus-size clothing
 XXX (disambiguation), the correct Roman numeral for 30